The Big White is a 2005 black comedy film directed by Mark Mylod starring Robin Williams, Holly Hunter, Giovanni Ribisi, Woody Harrelson, Tim Blake Nelson, W. Earl Brown and Alison Lohman.

In a podcast interview with Marc Maron in 2010, Williams admitted that during filming, he started drinking again after 20 years of sobriety. This would lead to a stint in rehab in 2006.

Plot
Travel agent Paul Barnell finds a body in a dumpster that, unbeknownst to him, was left there by Mafia hitmen. Heavily in debt and attempting to find a cure for his wife Margaret's apparent Tourette syndrome, he stages a disfiguring animal attack with the body in order to cash in his missing brother's life-insurance policy, for which a corpse is required.

Local police are convinced, but promotion-hungry insurance agent Ted Waters is not. The hitmen who dumped the body are also in search of the corpse for proof to collect their payment. They take Margaret hostage to ensure that they will get the body. Meanwhile, Ted is having problems with his girlfriend, Tiffany, who he neglects as he works his way up in his firm.

Paul's missing brother Raymond returns home, beats him up, and demands a portion of the insurance money. By suggesting that Ted assaulted him, Paul speeds up the delivery of the million dollar insurance payment. He has the body exhumed and agrees to exchange it and a portion of the money for Margaret. Fearing that Raymond will attempt to kill Margaret to keep her quiet, Paul considers killing his brother in his sleep, but cannot bring himself to do so.

The next morning Paul leaves his brother asleep and meets the hit-men for the exchange. Raymond is angered at his brother's deception and arrives as well, and is told by the insurance agent, who has finally pieced together what has happened, about his million dollar policy. Raymond then pulls out a pistol and shoots Margaret in the back as she flees. He is in turn shot in the stomach by one of the hitmen. Paul finds Margaret alive; he had hidden the insurance money in her jacket, and it stopped the bullet. The brothers say goodbye as Raymond dies. Paul tells Ted that he only committed fraud out of love for his wife, which appeals to Ted's renewed feelings for Tiffany; touched, he lets them go. Using the money, Paul takes Margaret on a tropical vacation.

Cast 
 Robin Williams - Paul Barnell
 Holly Hunter - Margaret Barnell
 Giovanni Ribisi - Ted Waters
 Tim Blake Nelson - Gary
 W. Earl Brown - Jimbo
 Woody Harrelson - Raymond Barnell
 Alison Lohman - Tiffany
 Billy Merasty - Cam (as William Merasty)
 Marina Stephenson Kerr - Avis
 Ralph Alderman - Mr. Branch
 Frank Adamson - Detective
 Andrea Shawcross - Hair Stylist
 Ryan Miranda - Korean-am Teenager
 Craig March - Howard
 Ty Wood - Paperboy

Production 
According to one insider, it was Collin Friesen's script that "drew the talent needed to get the production off the ground."  Production was based in Winnipeg, though it was filmed in the Yukon Territory;  the film had a $1 million impact on the territory's economy, including the employment of 200 Yukoners.  Most of the outdoor scenes and cinematography were shot at summit of the White Pass along the border of Alaska and British Columbia.  The bulk of the film was shot in April, 2004.

Reception
In November 2005, Variety, after seeing the film at the AFI Fest in Los Angeles, called it "snowed under by misjudgment on every level", with "frigid" commercial prospects.  In March 2006, David Mattin of the BBC gave it three stars out of five, saying the film "wants to be a cross between small-screen hits Northern Exposure and Frasier" but "can't resist the lure of cheap and obvious one-liners"; Mattin calls William's performance "typically slushy and ultimately likeable" and Ribisi's a performance that "really shines", but notes that the viewer is mostly subjected to "limp gags based on [Hunter]'s compulsive swearing, and Harrelson's cliché-ridden small-town hick stupidity."

On Rotten Tomatoes the film has an approval rating of 30% based on reviews from 10 critics.

References

External links 
 
 

Canadian black comedy films
New Zealand black comedy films
American black comedy films
2000s English-language films
2005 films
Films directed by Mark Mylod
Films scored by Mark Mothersbaugh
Films set in Alaska
Films shot in Alaska
Films shot in Yukon
2000s American films
2000s Canadian films